Agostinho da Silva Araujo (born 28 August 1997), also known as Agostinho, is a football player who currently plays for Timor-Leste national football team.

International career
Agostinho made his senior international debut against Mongolia national football team in the 2018 FIFA World Cup qualification (AFC) on 12 March 2015.

References

External links
 

1997 births
Living people
East Timorese footballers
Timor-Leste international footballers
F.C. Porto Taibesi players
Association football defenders
Footballers at the 2014 Asian Games
Asian Games competitors for East Timor